"Game Day" is the ninth episode of the first season of the HBO original series The Wire (2002-2008). The episode was written by David H. Melnick and Shamit Choksey from a story by David Simon and Ed Burns and was directed by Milčo Mančevski. It originally aired on August 4, 2002.

Plot

Stringer and Avon visit a gym to arrange a junior college athlete to play for them at an upcoming Eastside/Westside basketball game. After their negotiations, they discuss the hunt for Omar. Stringer wants to feign passivity until Omar re-emerges, but Avon is adamant that they need to kill him for the sake of street cred. Meanwhile, in the projects, Wallace tells D'Angelo that he does not want to work anymore because he is unsettled by the Omar heist and the deaths of Brandon and Stinkum. D'Angelo gives him his blessing to return to school and hands him some cash as well. Poot later goes looking for Wallace and finds him buying drugs.

Bubbles and Johnny spot Walon, the speaker from their Narcotics Anonymous meeting. They are distracted by Bodie, who is throwing out free vials of the new product. Bubs approaches Walon afterward and learns that he is still clean, but has come to the projects to try to convince his nephew to go straight. Later, Bubbles steals a large stash and shoots up with Johnny, only to realize that it is mere baking soda. Bubbles is motivated to visit his sister and persuades her that he is serious about getting clean. She reluctantly gives him a key so that he can use her basement, but forbids him from coming upstairs.

The detail's surveillance work continues with Herc and Carver on the streets and Freamon, Sydnor, and Prez back at the office. They intercept a call and learn that Wee-Bey is going to be moving some money. Herc and Carver intercept him and take the money, telling him that he can get it from the State's Attorney if he can explain where it came from. They discuss keeping some, but Carver decides it would not be worth the risk with the wire running. They deliver the money back to the office and listen in on a call that Poot makes to his girlfriend. After a substantial amount of phone sex, they hear something pertinent. McNulty and Prez both note that they cannot use the call as evidence without justifying it. Later, Daniels finds the money short. Thinking Herc and Carver stole it, he tells them that they have until roll call the following morning to bring it back. The two bicker, each suspecting the other, but when the cash turns up in their car, Carver apologizes to Herc.

Tension builds between McNulty and Daniels. When McNulty remarks that they need to extend the wiretap, Daniels responds angrily. Freamon backs up Daniels, saying that he is in a difficult position between his men and the bosses. Freamon instructs Sydnor and Prez in tracking the money which the crew is making. He gets records from City Hall showing massive campaign contributions from the Barksdales to various politicians. These efforts also reveal information on the Barksdales' front organizations, including a funeral parlor, a strip club, and several warehouses. At the basketball game, Avon mocks Proposition Joe's attempt to dress like a real coach. Poot and Bodie explain the game to Herc and Carver: the loser has to throw a party for both crews. Carver and Herc try to identify Avon but have no idea whom they are looking for. Sydnor arrives and quickly recognizes Avon from his old boxing photo.

Freamon and Greggs pick up Shardene, the exotic dancer from Orlando's, the Barksdale-run strip club. In an attempt to turn her, they take her to identify Keisha's corpse, which has been found wrapped up in a rug and left in a dumpster. Here it is confirmed that she was indeed raped (unbeknownst to the police by Wee-Bey), as hinted at in the last episode. Appalled and distraught upon realizing D'Angelo was almost certainly involved in the disposal of Keisha's body, Shardene agrees to assist the police and moves out of D'Angelo's apartment. When he asks her for a reason, she hints that she knows what really happened to Keisha. She may also believe that D'Angelo was Keisha's rapist instead of Wee-Bey. Omar continues stalking the projects looking for a way to get at Avon. He eventually makes his way to Proposition Joe's place and offers some of his takings from the Barksdales' stash in exchange for Avon's pager number. Omar tracks Avon to Orlando's and tricks him into answering a page using Wee-Bey's code. Wee-Bey pulls up and Avon realizes that something is amiss. He dives out of range just as Omar opens fire. Wee-Bey and Omar exchange shots and Wee-Bey wings Omar who, wounded, retreats.

Production

Title reference
The title refers to the Eastside/Westside basketball game (pictured).

Epigraph

Herc says this to Carver when they cannot find anyone in the Baltimore ghettos (not yet realizing that most residents are attending the East Side vs. West Side basketball game), in reference to Carver's comment in "The Target" that the War on Drugs will never end.

Credits

Starring cast
Although credited, John Doman, Frankie Faison, Deirdre Lovejoy, and Wendell Pierce do not appear in this episode.

Guest stars

First appearances
Proposition Joe: Eastside Drug Kingpin and Avon's rival in the basketball game.

The articles of corporation for the front company B-Squared (viewed by Prez on microfilm) show that Maurice Levy's address is 450 North Lombard Street, Baltimore, Maryland. The articles give the purposes of the business as that of a funeral parlor.

References

External links
"Game Day"  at HBO.com

The Wire (season 1) episodes
2002 American television episodes